Travers railway station is a railway station in the municipality of Val-de-Travers, in the Swiss canton of Neuchâtel. It is located at the junction of the standard gauge Neuchâtel–Pontarlier line of Swiss Federal Railways and the Travers–Buttes line of Transports publics Neuchâtelois.

Services
The following services stop at Travers:

References

External links 
 
 

Railway stations in the canton of Neuchâtel
Swiss Federal Railways stations